William Ambrose Brown (January 3, 1878 – July 12, 1965) was an American bishop who served as the fourth Bishop of Southern Virginia between 1938 and 1950.

Early life and education
Brown was born in Albemarle County, Virginia, on January 3, 1878, the son of Henry William Brown and Sarah Slade Runyard, who emigrated to the United States from England in 1872. He was educated at the public schools of Danville, Virginia, and later at Roanoke College from where he graduated with a Bachelor of Arts in 1898 and a Master of Arts in 1901. He also graduated with a Bachelor of Divinity from the Virginia Theological Seminary in 1902. He was awarded a Doctor of Divinity from Virginia Theological Seminary in 1917 and a Doctor of Laws from Roanoke College in 1938.

Ordained ministry
Brown was ordained deacon in 1901 and priest on May 29, 1902, by Bishop Alfred Magill Randolph of Virginia, during which he served as rector of Christ Church in Blacksburg, Virginia. In 1902 he became rector of Magill Memorial Church in Pulaski, Virginia, and in 1904 he became rector of St. John's Church in Portsmouth, Virginia, a post he held until 1938. His daughter, Mary Brown Channel, would go on to design additions to the latter structure during her architectural career.

Episcopacy
Brown was elected Bishop of Southern Virginia 1938 and was consecrated on May 3, 1938, by Presiding Bishop Henry St. George Tucker at St John's Church, Portsmouth, Virginia. He retired in May 1950 and died on July 12, 1965.

Family
Brown married twice, first to Mary Ramsey in 1902 and, after her death, he then married Winifred Washington Watts in 1938. He had two children from his first marriage, including Mary Brown Channel, the first woman licensed to practice architecture in Virginia.

References

1965 deaths
1878 births
Virginia Theological Seminary alumni
People from Albemarle County, Virginia
Religious leaders from Virginia
Roanoke College alumni
20th-century Anglican bishops in the United States
Episcopal bishops of Southern Virginia